Jane Gillette is an American dentist and politician serving as a member of the Montana House of Representatives from the 64th district. Elected in November 2020, she assumed office on January 4, 2021.

Education 
Gillette earned a Bachelor of Science degree in biology from Pacific Lutheran University, a Doctor of Dental Surgery from the University of Washington in 2002, and a Master of Public Health from the University of Montana.

Career 
Gillette served in the United States Air Force from 1993 to 2013. She later worked as the dental director of Community Health Partners and owner of the Mint Dental Studio. Gillette is now a clinical research dentist, specializing in oral disease prevention, health disparities, and evidence-based dentistry. She previously served as a health consultant to Greg Gianforte. Gillette was elected to the Montana House of Representatives in November 2020 and assumed office in January 2021.

References 

1971 births
21st-century American politicians
American dentists
Living people
Republican Party members of the Montana House of Representatives
Pacific Lutheran University alumni
People from Bozeman, Montana
People from Tacoma, Washington
University of Montana alumni
University of Washington alumni
United States Air Force officers
Women state legislators in Montana
21st-century American women politicians